Alice Vailea (born 30 January 1996) is a New Zealand rugby league footballer who played as  for the New Zealand Warriors in the NRL Women's Premiership.

Playing career
In 2016, Vailea represented the Akarana Falcons while playing for the Bay Roskill Vikings.

In June 2018, while playing for the Richmond Roses, she was named in the New Zealand train-on squad. That year, she was named the Auckland Rugby League Women's Player of the Year.

On 1 August 2018, she was announced as a member of the inaugural New Zealand Warriors NRL Women's Premiership squad.

References

1996 births
Living people
New Zealand female rugby league players
Rugby league second-rows
New Zealand Warriors (NRLW) players